Dixie is an unincorporated community in Fluvanna County, in the Commonwealth of Virginia.  Dixie is located at the eastern intersection of U.S. 15 and State Rt. 6.

References

Unincorporated communities in Virginia
Unincorporated communities in Fluvanna County, Virginia